The Self-portrait is commonly dated between 1504 and 1506. It measures 47.5 cm by 33 cm. The portrait was noted in an inventory of the private collection of Duke Leopoldo de' Medici, completed in 1675, and later listed in the 1890 Uffizi inventory.

See also
List of paintings by Raphael

Notes

References

External links

Portraits by Raphael
Paintings by Raphael in the Uffizi
1500s paintings
Raphael